Innovation is an unincorporated area and census-designated place (CDP) in Prince William County, Virginia, United States. As of the 2020 census, it had a population of 926.

The CDP is in the central part of the county, bordered to the southeast by the independent city of Manassas. It is bordered to the north by the Bull Run CDP, and to the west by the Linton Hall CDP.

Virginia State Route 234 (Prince William Parkway) runs through the center of the community, leading northwest  to Interstate 66 near Gainesville and southeast  to Interstate 95 at Dumfries. State Route 28 runs along the southern edge of the Innovation CDP, leading east into Manassas and southwest  to U.S. Route 17 at Bealeton.

References 

Populated places in Prince William County, Virginia
Census-designated places in Prince William County, Virginia
Census-designated places in Virginia